ILQ may refer to:

 The airport-code of the Ilo Airport in Peru.
 The abbreviation for InLine Qualified, a brand of bearings used in inline-skates.
 ILQ is an acronym for I Love Qatar. 
 Lechang East railway station, China Railway telegraph code ILQ